Central Market may refer to:

Central Market, a 2009 album by Tyondai Braxton

Fresh food markets
Adelaide Central Market, Australia
Cardiff Central Market, Wales
Central Market, Hong Kong
Central Market, Casablanca, Morocco
Riga Central Market, Latvia
Central Market (Columbus, Ohio), United States
Central Market, Kuala Lumpur, Malaysia
Central Market (Lancaster), United States
Central Market (Paramaribo), Suriname
Central Market, Phnom Penh, Cambodia
 Central Market (Rostov-on-Don), Russia
Central Market, Sabadell, Catalonia, Spain
Central Market, Santiago, Chile
Lajpat Nagar Central Market, Delhi

Grocery chains
Central Market (Texas), a gourmet grocery store chain

See also
Mercado Central (disambiguation)